In mathematics, the irregularity of a complex surface X is the Hodge number , usually denoted by q. The irregularity of an algebraic surface is sometimes defined to be this Hodge number, and sometimes defined to be the dimension of the Picard variety, which is the same in characteristic 0 but can be smaller in positive characteristic.

The name "irregularity" comes from the fact that for the first surfaces investigated in detail, the smooth complex surfaces in P3, the irregularity happens to vanish. The irregularity then appeared as a new "correction" term measuring the difference  of the geometric genus and the arithmetic genus of more complicated surfaces. Surfaces are sometimes called regular or irregular depending on whether or not the irregularity vanishes.

Complex surfaces
For non-singular complex projective (or Kähler) surfaces, the following numbers are all equal:
The irregularity;
The dimension of the Albanese variety;
The dimension of the Picard variety;
The Hodge number ; 
The Hodge number ;
The difference  of the geometric genus and the arithmetic genus.

For surfaces in positive characteristic, or for non-Kähler complex surfaces, the numbers above need not all be equal.

Henri Poincaré proved that for complex projective surfaces the dimension of the Picard variety is equal to the Hodge number h0,1, and the same is true for all compact Kähler surfaces. The irregularity of smooth compact Kähler surfaces is invariant under bimeromorphic transformations.

For general compact complex surfaces the two Hodge numbers h1,0 and h0,1 need not be equal, but h0,1 is either h1,0 or h1,0+1, and is equal to h1,0 for compact Kähler surfaces.

Positive characteristic
Over fields of positive characteristic, the relation between q (defined as the dimension of the Picard or Albanese variety), and the Hodge numbers h0,1 and h1,0 is more complicated, and any two of them can be different.

There is a canonical map from a surface F to its Albanese variety A which induces a homomorphism from the cotangent space of the Albanese variety (of dimension q) to H1,0(F). In positive characteristic neither Hodge number is always bounded by the other. Serre showed that it is possible for h1,0 to vanish while 
h0,1 is positive, while Mumford showed that for Enriques surfaces in characteristic 2 it is possible for h0,1 to vanish while h1,0 is positive.

Alexander Grothendieck gave a complete description of the relation of q to in all characteristics. In characteristic 0 a result of Pierre Cartier showed that all groups schemes of finite type are non-singular, so the dimension of their tangent space is their dimension. On the other hand, in positive characteristic it is possible for a group scheme to be non-reduced at every point so that the dimension is less than the dimension of any tangent space, which is what happens in Igusa's example. Mumford shows that the tangent space to the Picard variety is the subspace of H0,1 annihilated by all Bockstein operations from H0,1 to H0,2, so the irregularity q is equal to h0,1 if and only if all these Bockstein operations vanish.

References

Algebraic surfaces
Complex surfaces